Roderick Norrish (born November 27, 1951) is a Canadian former professional ice hockey player who played 21 games in the National Hockey League with the Minnesota North Stars during the 1973–74 and 1974–5 seasons. Norrish was born in Saskatoon, Saskatchewan.

Career statistics

Regular season and playoffs

Awards
 WCHL All-Star Team – 1971

External links

1951 births
Living people
Canadian ice hockey left wingers
Cleveland Barons (1937–1973) players
Ice hockey people from Saskatchewan
Jacksonville Barons players
Minnesota North Stars draft picks
Minnesota North Stars players
New Haven Nighthawks players
Regina Pats players
Sportspeople from Saskatoon
Western International Hockey League players
Weyburn Red Wings players